Maron, also called Maroun or Maro, was a 4th-century Syrian Syriac Christian hermit monk in the Taurus Mountains whose followers, after his death, founded a religious Christian movement that became known as the Syriac Maronite Church, in full communion with the Holy See and the Catholic Church. The religious community which grew from this movement are the modern Maronites.

Saint Maron is often portrayed in a black monastic habit with a hanging stole, accompanied by a long crosier staffed by a globe surmounted with a cross. His feast day in the Maronite Church is February 9.

Life
Maron, born in what is now modern Syria, in the middle of the 4th century, was a priest who later became a hermit, retiring to the Taurus Mountains in the region of Cyrrhus, near Antioch. His holiness and miracles attracted many followers, and drew attention throughout the empire. John Chrysostom wrote to him around AD 405 expressing his great love and respect, and asking Maron to pray for him. Maron and Chrysostom are believed to have studied together in the great Christian learning center at Antioch, which at the time was the third largest city in the Roman Empire.

Maron embraced a life of quiet solitude in the mountains north-west of Aleppo. He was known for his simplicity and his extraordinary desire to discover God's presence in all things.

Maron is considered the Father of the spiritual and monastic movement now called the Maronite Church.

Monastic spirituality
Maron's way was deeply monastic with emphasis on the spiritual and ascetic aspects of living. For Maron, all was connected to God and God was connected to all. He did not separate the physical and spiritual world and actually used the physical world to deepen his faith and spiritual experience with God. He was able to free himself from the physical world by his passion and fervour for prayer and enter into a mystical relationship of love with God.

He lived his life in the open air next to a temple he had transformed to a church. He spent his time in prayer and meditation exposed to the forces of nature such as sun, rain, hail and snow. Theodoret of Cyrrhus wrote that this was a new type of asceticism that soon enjoyed wide acceptance in Syria and Lebanon. His Religious History, written around AD 440, mentions fifteen men and three women who followed this practice, many of them trained or guided by Maron.

Missionary
Saint Maron was a mystic who started this new ascetic-spiritual method that attracted many people in Syria and Lebanon to become his disciples. Accompanying his deeply spiritual and ascetic life, he was a zealous missionary with a passion to spread the message of Christ by preaching it to all he met. He sought not only to cure the physical ailments that people suffered, but had a great quest for nurturing and healing the "lost souls" of both non-Christians and Christians of his time.

This missionary work came to fruition when in the mountains of Syria, Saint Maron was able to convert a temple into a Christian church in Kafr Nabu. This was to be the beginning of the conversion to Christianity in Syria which would then influence and spread to Lebanon. After his death in the year 410 in Kalota, his spirit and teachings lived on through his disciples.

His burial place is a debated issue. Some Lebanese sources, such as Giuseppe Simone Assemani and Maronite bishop Yusef al-Dibs believed he was buried in Arethusa or modern-day al-Rastan along the Orontes River in Syria, while others, like Jesuit priest Henri Lammens, have claimed he is buried in Brad village to the north of Aleppo.

The Maronite movement reached Lebanon when Saint Maron's first disciple, Abraham of Cyrrhus, who was called the Apostle of Lebanon, realized that there were many non-Christians in Lebanon and so he set out to convert them to Christianity by introducing them to the way of Saint Maron. William of Tyre, chronicling his arrival in the region of Lebanon during the crusades, writes of the Maronites that they took their name from a certain Maro, whose heresies (described as monothelitism) they followed for "almost five hundred years", but which they recanted at the time of William's report. Though William of Tyre's indictment of "Maro and his followers" as monothelite heretics has resulted in controversy among scholars, in all probability he was mistakenly referring to a Maro from Edessa instead of the fourth-century St. Maro. Maronite historians argue that they have always remained in full communion with Rome. Saint Maron's feast day is celebrated on February 9.

Veneration
Saint Maron was known for his gift for healing.

Patronages
Maronites and the Syriac Maronite Church 
The town of Volperino in Italy. After being brought to Sassovivo Abbey in Foligno, Saint Maron's relics were kept for a long time in the tiny village of Volperino, before being transferred to Saint Felicianus Cathedral church in Foligno.
The Eparchy of Saint Maron of Brooklyn
The Eparchy of Saint Maron of Canada - Montréal, Canada  - Official Website
The Eparchy of Saint Maron of Australia.

Notable recognitions
On 23 February 2011, Pope Benedict XVI unveiled a statue of Saint Maron on the outer wall of Saint Peter's Basilica in the Vatican and imparted his Apostolic Blessing. The 15 feet tall statue was commissioned by the Maronite Church to the Spanish sculptor Marco Augusto Dueñas. The saint appears in the sculpture holding a miniature, Maronite style church; the sculpture also features an inscription in Syriac reading: The righteous will flourish like a palm tree, they will grow like a cedar of Lebanon.  The statue occupied the last available niche in the outer perimeter of Saint Peter's Basilica.

In June 2012, an impressionist painting of Saint Maron, as well as several icons based on images from the 5th-century Syriac Rabboula manuscript including the Crucifixion, the Marian icon of the "Mother of Light" and the Evangelists, was donated, installed and was solemnly attended by Cardinal Donald Wuerl at the National Shrine of the Immaculate Conception in Washington D.C., and was formally dedicated on September 23, 2012.

See also

James the Solitary
Syriac Maronite Church
5th century in Lebanon

References

External links

Our Lady of Lebanon
The Eastern Catholic Churches
The Maronite Hermits
German Homepage of Maronitische Christliche Union Deutschlands e.V. Arabic/German
Our Lady of Lebanon Lewisville, Tx

410 deaths
4th-century births
4th-century Romans
5th-century Byzantine monks
4th-century Christian mystics
5th-century Christian mystics
Roman Catholic mystics
 
Maronite saints
Syrian Christian saints
5th-century Christian saints
Byzantine Christians
Lebanese Maronite saints
People from Cyrrhus
4th-century people
5th-century people